"Summer Wear" is a science fiction short story  by American writer L. Sprague de Camp, part of his Viagens Interplanetarias series. It is the first (chronologically) set on the planet Osiris. It was first published in the magazine Startling Stories in the issue for May, 1950. It first appeared in book form in the anthology The Best Science Fiction Stories: 1951, edited by Everett F. Bleiler and T. E. Dikty, published in hardcover by Frederick Fell in 1951, and was gathered together with other Viagens stories in the collection The Continent Makers and Other Tales of the Viagens, published in hardcover by Twayne Publishers in 1953, and in paperback by Signet Books in 1971. The story has been translated into Portuguese, Dutch, Italian and German.

Plot summary
Terrans Cato Chapman and Celia Zorn, respectively a salesman and model affiliated with the fashionable summer wear firm Greenfarb's of Hollywood, embark on the Viagens starship Camões, bound for the planet Osiris. They hope to create a market for Greenfarb's styles among the reptilian Osirians, who natively wear nothing but body paint.

Chapman and Celia quickly discover they have rivals on board; Jean-Jaques Bergerat and Anya Savinkov, representing Tomaselli's of Paris. Amid interesting interplay with the other passengers, including both Terrans and alien Osirians and Thothians, the voyage becomes a double exercise in industrial espionage as Chapman and Bergerat each attempt to sabotage the other. Bergerat succeeds in spoiling Chapman's samples, but is caught and incarcerated due to Chapman's machinations; the latter thereupon appropriates Bergerat's own samples as replacements.

On Osiris, Chapman, Celia and Anya hold a fashion show, their products become wildly popular with the Osirians, and they secure a contract for Greenfarb's. Chapman and Bergerat end their dispute on the return voyage and each becomes involved with (and marries) his former rival's business partner. As the interstellar voyage between the Solar System and the Procyon system harboring Osiris takes five months subjective time (and over ten years objective time) each way, there is ample opportunity for such bonds to form.

Back on Earth, a surprise awaits them; Osirian body paint has become the rage there during their nearly two dozen years' absence, and both Greenfarb's and Tomaselli's have gone out of business!

The action of "Summer Wear" takes place in the years 2104-2128 AD.

Setting
The planet Osiris is an arid world whose dinosauroid inhabitants are characterized as both sentimental and rapaciously capitalistic; they are also possessed of mind-controlling powers, generally referred to as "telepathic pseudohypnosis," against which other intelligent species must take special precautions. Osiris occupies the same star system as Thoth, a wet planet whose natives are amoral and anarchic.

References

Sources

1950 short stories
Fiction set around Procyon
Short stories by L. Sprague de Camp
Works originally published in Startling Stories